In its original meaning during the late 18th and 19th centuries, a "Little Englander" was a member of the Liberal Party who was opposed to expansion of the British Empire, as well as certain traditionalist conservatives who wanted England to extend no farther than its borders at the time. The term was also used for English people who saw the British Empire's colonies as economically burdensome and wanted them to be granted independence as quickly as possible.

Since the 2010s (especially due to the 2016 Brexit referendum) the term has become a popular derogatory way to describe a xenophobic English person who thinks England is superior to all other countries, shows support for English nationalism, and does not believe in working together with other countries unless it benefits England. The derogatory epithet "gammon" has been used in British political culture for similar reasons since 2012.

History
The "Little England" movement originated among manufacturers in Manchester and found support among journalists such as Goldwin Smith. The movement objected to the protectionist stance of British Canada, which was exemplified by the tariff increase of 1859. The manufacturers resented paying taxes to defend a colony that imported few British goods, but exported so many. Moreover, it was believed that the United States could become a much more important partner as it was already Britain's best customer outside Europe. There was also a social element to the movement. The Manchester School opposed the Empire for providing sinecures for the sons of the aristocracy when the same money could be used for tax breaks to industrialists at home. The Little England stance was adopted by a wing of the Liberal Party typified by William Gladstone (1809–1898), who opposed many of Britain's military ventures in the late 19th century. It is particularly associated with opposition to the Second Boer War (1899–1902). For example, Arthur Ponsonby wrote of the Liberal leader Sir Henry Campbell-Bannerman's opposition to the Boer War: "The impression one got of him from the Press in those days was … that he was an unpatriotic Little Englander".

In literature
The term "little England" predates its political usage; the expression "this little England" was used in the Gunpowder Day sermon of the English Puritan preacher Thomas Hooker (5 November 1626).  It is also used in Shakespeare's play Henry VIII (1601), when the Old Lady tells Anne Boleyn: "In faith, for little England / You'd venture an emballing: / I myself would for Carnarvonshire."

Contemporary usage
The Cambridge online dictionary defines "Little Englander" as "an English person who thinks England is better than all other countries, and that England should only work together with other countries when there is an advantage for England in doing so". The term has been used as a derogatory term for English nationalists and English people who are xenophobic or overly nationalistic. It has also been applied to opponents of globalism, multilateralism, and internationalism. Since the 2010s, especially post-Brexit, the term has gained popularity as a derogatory way to describe supporters of English nationalism and xenophobia. For this reason, it is similar to the insult "gammon", which has been used in British political culture since 2012.

See also
 Gammon (insult)
 Merry England

References

English nationalism
Resistance to the British Empire
Politics of England
Anti-imperialism in Europe